Cristoforo Mantegazza (c. 1430 – 1482) was an Italian sculptor who was active from 1464. 

He was born in Pavia. Among his other works, he collaborated with his brother Antonio on the façade of the Certosa of Pavia (relief with the Expulsion from the Garden of Eden), one of the masterworks of northern Italy's Renaissance. For a certain period he also directed the construction of that building.

References

1430s births
1482 deaths
Artists from Pavia
15th-century Italian sculptors
Italian male sculptors